Zaruni Hamat Beyg (also Romanized as Ẕarūnī Hamat Beyg) is a village in Gol Gol Rural District, in the Central District of Kuhdasht County, Lorestan Province, Iran. At the 2006 census, its population was 52, in 11 families.

References 

Towns and villages in Kuhdasht County